Benjamin Louis Paul Godard (18 August 184910 January 1895) was a French violinist and Romantic-era composer of Jewish extraction, best known for his opera Jocelyn. Godard composed eight operas, five symphonies, two piano and two violin concertos, string quartets, sonatas for violin and piano, piano pieces and etudes, and more than a hundred songs. He died at the age of 45 in Cannes (Alpes-Maritimes) of tuberculosis and was buried in the family tomb in Taverny in the French department of Val-d'Oise.

Life and career

Godard was born in Paris in 1849. He entered the Conservatoire de Paris in 1863 where he studied under Henri Vieuxtemps (violin) and Napoléon Henri Reber (harmony) and accompanied Vieuxtemps twice to Germany.

In 1876, his Concerto romantique was performed at the Concerts Populaires, and other of his large works were also performed at these concerts. In 1878, Godard was the co-winner of the Prix de la Ville de Paris. His winning composition, a dramatic symphony entitled Le Tasso, remains one of his most admired works.

From that time until his death Godard wrote a large number of compositions. These include eight operas, among them: Jocelyn (the "Berceuse" from which remains Godard's best-known composition), performed in Paris in 1888; Dante, played at the Opéra-Comique two years later; and La Vivandière, left unfinished and completed by Paul Vidal (1863–1931). The last of these was heard at the Opéra-Comique in 1895, and was played in England by the Carl Rosa Opera Company.

He became a professor at the Conservatoire de Paris in 1887, and was made a Chevalier (Knight) of the Légion d'honneur in 1889.

Works
Godard's long list of works includes five symphonies: Symphonie gothique (1883), Symphonie orientale (1884), and Symphonie légendaire (1886); Concerto romantique for violin and orchestra (1876), two piano concertos, three string quartets, four sonatas for violin and piano, a sonata for cello and piano, two piano trios, and various other orchestral works. Among his piano pieces may be mentioned Mazurka No. 2, Valse No. 2, Au Matin, Postillon, En Courant, En Train, and Les Hirondelles. Florian's Song is also very popular and has been arranged for many instruments. He wrote more than 100 songs.

According to the Encyclopædia Britannica Eleventh Edition, "Godard's compositions are unequal, if only because his productivity was enormous. He was at his best in works of smaller dimensions. Among his more ambitious works, the Symphonie légendaire may be singled out as being one of the most distinctive."

Godard was opposed to the music of Richard Wagner and also highly critical of Wagner's antisemitism. Godard's musical style was more in tune with those of Felix Mendelssohn and Robert Schumann.

Operas

References

External links 

 
 Benjamin Godard Piano Trio No.1 in g minor, Op.32—sound-bites and a discussion of the work
Piano trio no. 1, op. 32 (1872), from the Sibley Music Library Digital Scores Collection
Piano trio no. 2, op. 72, F major (1880), from the Sibley Music Library Digital Scores Collection
Symphonie gothique pour orchestre, op. 23 (1890), from the Sibley Music Library Digital Scores Collection
Troisième sonate pour piano & violon, op. 9 (1880), from the Sibley Music Library Digital Scores Collection
Fantasie persane : pour piano et orchestre ou 2 pianos, op. 152 (1900), from the Sibley Music Library Digital Scores Collection
Songs by Benjamin Godard on The Art Song Project

1849 births
1895 deaths
19th-century classical composers
19th-century French male classical violinists
19th-century deaths from tuberculosis
19th-century French composers
Chevaliers of the Légion d'honneur
Conservatoire de Paris alumni
19th-century French Jews
French male classical composers
French opera composers
French Romantic composers
Jewish classical composers
Male opera composers
Musicians from Paris
Tuberculosis deaths in France